Within plant communities, NVC Community M16 (Erica tetralix - Sphagnum compactum wet heath) is one of the 38 mire communities in the British National Vegetation Classification system.

Community composition
The following species are found in this community

  Erica tetralix
  Sphagnum compactum

See also
List of plant communities in the British National Vegetation Classification

References

 JNCC Report  No. 394  The European context of British Lowland Grasslands  J.S. Rodwell1, V. Morgan2, R.G. Jefferson3 & D. Moss4  February 2007  JNCC, Peterborough 2007  jncc.defra.gov.uk
 NATIONAL VEGETATION CLASSIFICATION field guide to mires and heaths, JNCC 2001,  

M16
Erica
Sphagnum